The Institute of Economic Affairs (IEA) is a right-wing pressure group and think tank registered as a UK charity Associated with the New Right, the IEA describes itself as an "educational research institute", and says that it seeks to "further the dissemination of free-market thinking", and that it does so by "analysing and expounding the role of markets in solving economic and social problems." The IEA subscribes to a neoliberal worldview and advocates positions based on this ideology. It published climate change denial material between 1994 and 2007, and has advocated total privatisation, in effect abolition, of the National Health Service (NHS), in favour of a healthcare system the IEA says is similar to Switzerland, Belgium, the Netherlands, Germany and Israel. The IEA has received more than £70,000 from the tobacco industry (although it does not reveal its funders), and IEA officers have been recorded offering "cash for access". The IEA is headquartered in Westminster, London, England.

Founded by businessman and battery farming pioneer Antony Fisher in 1955, the IEA was one of the first modern think tanks, and promoted Thatcherite right-wing ideology, and free market and monetarist economic policies. The IEA has been criticised for operating in a manner closer to that of a lobbying operation than as a genuine think tank. The IEA publishes an academic journal (Economic Affairs), a student magazine (EA), books and discussion papers, and holds regular lectures.

History
In 1945, Antony Fisher read an article in Reader's Digest that was a summary of The Road to Serfdom by Friedrich Hayek. Later that year, Fisher visited Hayek at the London School of Economics.  Hayek dissuaded Fisher from embarking on a political and parliamentary career to try to prevent the spread of socialism and central planning. Instead, Hayek suggested the establishment of a body which could engage in research and reach the intellectuals with reasoned argument.

In June 1955, The Free Convertibility of Sterling by George Winder was published, with Fisher signing the foreword as Director of the IEA. In November 1955, the IEA's Original Trust Deed was signed by Fisher, John Harding and Oliver Smedley. Ralph Harris (later Lord Harris) began work as part-time General Director in January 1957. He was joined in 1958 by Arthur Seldon who was initially appointed Editorial Advisor and became the Editorial Director in 1959. Smedley wrote to Fisher that it was "imperative that we should give no indication in our literature that we are working to educate the public along certain lines which might be interpreted as having a political bias. … That is why the first draft [of the IEA's aims] is written in rather cagey terms".

The Social Affairs Unit was established in December 1980 as an offshoot of the Institute of Economic Affairs to carry the IEA's economic ideas onto the battleground of sociology. "Within a few years the Social Affairs Unit became independent from the IEA, acquiring its own premises." In 1986 the IEA created a Health and Welfare Unit to focus on these aspects of social policy. Discussing the IEA's increasing influence under the Conservative government in the 1980s in relation to the "advent of Thatcherism" and the privatisation of public services, Dieter Plehwe, a Research Fellow at the WZB Berlin Social Science Center, has written thatThe arguably most influential think tank in British history... benefited from the close alignment of IEA's neoliberal agenda with corporate interests and the priorities of the Thatcher government.

In 2007, British journalist Andrew Marr called the IEA "undoubtedly the most influential think tank in modern British history". Damien Cahill, a Professor of Political Economy at the University of Sydney, has characterised the IEA as, "Britain's oldest and leading neoliberal think tank".

In October 2009, the IEA appointed Mark Littlewood as its Director General with effect from 1 December 2009.

In September 2022, an associated think tank, the Free Market Forum was founded.

Purpose and aims
The IEA's director Mark Littlewood said "We want to totally reframe the debate about the proper role of the state and civil society in our country … Our true mission is to change the climate of opinion."

The IEA has written policy papers arguing against government funding for pressure groups and charities involved in political campaigning. This does not violate rules governing funding as the IEA does not receive government funding. As a registered charity, the IEA must abide by Charity Commission rules, that state that "an organisation will not be charitable if its purposes are political". In July 2018 the Charity Commission announced that it was to investigate whether the IEA had broken its rules.

The conclusion of the investigation found that one of the IEA's report on Brexit was too political; the regulator told the IEA to remove the report from its website in early November 2018, and issued an official warning in February 2019, requiring trustees to provide written assurances that the IEA would not engage in campaigning or political activity contravening legal or regulatory requirements. The IEA removed the report on 19 November and said it complied with the Commission's other guidance by 23 November. IEA trustees were also required to set up a system whereby research reports and launch plans are signed off by trustees.

Following the IEA's compliance, the Charity Commission withdrew the official warning in June 2019. A compliance case into the IEA remained open, examining concerns about the trustees' management and oversight of the charity's activities.

According to George Monbiot, the IEA supports privatising the National Health Service (NHS); campaigns against controls on junk food; attacks trades unions; and defends zero-hour contracts, unpaid internships and tax havens. IEA staff are frequently invited by the BBC and other news media to appear on broadcasts.

In October 2019, The Guardian said that the IEA published, between 1994 and 2007, "at least four books, as well as multiple articles and papers, ... suggesting manmade climate change may be uncertain or exaggerated [and that] climate change is either not significantly driven by human activity or will be positive".

Concerns about political independence; investigation
The Observer reported on 29 July 2018 that the director of the IEA was secretly recorded in May and June telling an undercover reporter that funders could get to know ministers on first-name terms and that his organisation was in "the Brexit influencing game". While seeking funding, Littlewood said that the IEA allowed donors to affect the "salience" of reports and to shape "substantial content". The recording was to be given to the Charity Commission on 30 July.

The Charity Commission, considering that the allegations raised by the recordings were "of a serious nature", on 20 July 2018  opened a regulatory compliance case into the IEA due to concerns about its political independence, after it became known that it offered potential US donors access to ministers while raising funds for research to promote free-trade deals favoured by proponents of a "hard Brexit". The Commission has powers to examine IEA financial records, legally compel it to provide information, and to disqualify trustees. The IEA denies it has breached charity law.

It was also revealed that, after the IEA published a report recommending more casinos, the casino industry donated £8,000 to the IEA.

Jon Trickett, the shadow Cabinet Office minister, welcoming the investigation into the IEA, said "on the road to Brexit, a small group of establishment figures, funded to the tune of millions, are covertly pursuing a political campaign in favour of extreme free trade, acting in effect as lobbyists for secretive corporate interests...there are serious questions that high-ranking Conservative ministers must now answer about their dealings with the IEA."

It was also revealed that Jersey Finance, representing financial interests in Jersey, paid for an IEA report saying that  tax havens (such as Jersey) benefited the wider economy, and did not diminish tax  revenues in other countries. The report recommended that their status be protected. The IEA did not disclose the funding from Jersey Finance. A similar IEA report about neighbouring Guernsey was funded by the financial services industry there. Following this, the IEA said that funding they received never influenced the conclusions of reports, and that their output was independent and free from conflict of interest.

Separately, the register of lobbyists concluded in 2019 that the IEA had not participated in consultant lobbying for E Foundation.

Freer launch
In March 2018 Freer was founded in order to promote a positive message of liberal, supply-side Conservative renewal. Freer held two meetings at the 2018 Conservative conference (with none in any other political parties' conferences) and is an offshoot of the IEA, remaining entirely within its structural and organisational control.

Cabinet ministers and MPs (including Michael Gove and Liz Truss) spoke at the organisation's launch. Truss called for a neoliberal "Tory revolution" spearheaded by "Uber-riding, Airbnb-ing, Deliveroo-eating freedom-fighters", comments which were criticised by the Morning Star for failing to take into consideration the quality of employment within the companies mentioned. Conservative blogger Paul Staines said that the launch "piqued the interest of senior ministers including Michael Gove, Dom Raab and Brexit brain Shanker Singham". The organisation has 24 parliamentary supporters – including prominent figures such as Truss, Chris Skidmore, Priti Patel, Ben Bradley and Kemi Badenoch – all of whom are Conservative MPs. Freer also holds events and publishes pamphlets for Conservative MPs, and has been referred to the Charity Commission by Private Eye for political bias.

Funding
The IEA is a registered educational and research charity. The organisation states that it is funded by "voluntary donations from individuals, companies and foundations who want to support its work, plus income from book sales and conferences" and says that it is "independent of any political party or group". The Charity Commission listed total income of £2.34 million and expenditure of £2.33 million for the financial year ending 31 March 2021.

The IEA does not disclose their sources of funding, and has been criticised by health charities and by George Monbiot in The Guardian for receiving funds from major tobacco companies whilst campaigning on tobacco industry issues. British American Tobacco (BAT) confirmed it had donated £40,000 to the IEA in 2013, £20,000 in 2012 and £10,000 in 2011, and Philip Morris International and Japan Tobacco International also confirmed they provide financial support to the IEA. In 2002, a leaked letter revealed that prominent IEA member, the right-wing writer Roger Scruton, had authored an IEA pamphlet attacking the World Health Organisation's campaign on tobacco, whilst failing to disclose that he – Scruton – was receiving £54,000 a year from Japan Tobacco International. In response, the IEA said it would introduce an author declaration policy. The IEA also says that it "accepts no tied funding".

An organisation called 'American Friends of the IEA' had received US$215,000 as of 2010 from the U.S.-based Donors Trust and Donors Capital Fund, donor-advised funds which support right-wing causes.

Think tank Transparify, which is funded by the Open Society Foundations, in 2015 ranked the IEA as one of the top three least transparent think tanks in the UK in relation to funding. The IEA responded by saying "it is a matter for individual donors whether they wish their donation to be public or private – we leave that entirely to their discretion", and that it has not "earmarked money for commissioned research work from any company".

Funding to the IEA from the alcohol industry, food industry, and sugar industry has also been documented. IEA Research Fellow Christopher Snowdon disclosed alcohol industry funding in a response to a British Medical Journal article in 2014.

In October 2018, an investigation by Greenpeace found that the IEA was also receiving funding from the oil giant BP, which was "[using] this access to press ministers on issues ranging from environmental and safety standards to British tax rates." In May 2019, the British Medical Journal revealed that British American Tobacco was continuing to fund the IEA.

In November 2022, the funding transparency website Who Funds You? rated the Institute as E, the lowest transparency rating (rating goes from A to E).

Reception
In or about 2019, on national radio station LBC, James O'Brien said that the IEA is a politically motivated lobbying organisation funded by "dark money", of "questionable provenance, with dubious ideas and validity", staffed by people who are not proper experts on their topic. The IEA complained to UK media regulator Ofcom that those remarks were inaccurate and unfair. In August 2021, Ofcom rejected the complaint.

Publications

Arthur Seldon proposed a series of Papers for economists to explore the neoliberal approach to the issues of the day. Eventually these emerged as the Hobart Papers; 154 had been published by August 2006. In addition, 32 Hobart Paperbacks had been released along with 139 Occasional Papers, 61 Readings and 61 Research Monographs. A large number of other titles has been published in association with trade and university presses.

The Journal of Economic Affairs was first published in October 1980 and continues to be published to the present day. IEA publications are sold throughout the world – reprinted and translated into over twenty-five languages. In the UK, many IEA titles have become mandatory in university and classroom reading lists.

IEA papers are arranged in a series of titles, each with its own 'brand image'. The main series of publications is complemented by the IEA's quarterly journal Economic Affairs.

In September 2008, the institute started the IEA blog.

Research
According to the IEA, although not an academic body, the institute's research activities are aided by an international Academic Advisory Council and a panel of Honorary Fellows. They say that their papers are subjected to the same refereeing process used by academic journals, and that the views expressed in IEA papers are those of the authors and not of the IEA, its trustees, directors or advisers.

The IEA has also published research in areas including  business ethics, economic development, education, pensions, regulation, taxation and transport.

Books and papers
 The Road to Serfdom, F. A. Hayek (1945) PDF The condensed version of as it appeared in the April 1945 edition of Reader's Digest 
 WHO, What and Why? Transnational Government, Legitimacy and the World Health Organization Roger Scruton (2000) 
 The World Turned Rightside Up A New Trading Agenda for the Age of Globalisation, John C. Hulsman 
 The Representation of Business in English Literature, Introduced and edited by Arthur Pollard Readings 53; 
 Anti-Liberalism 2000 The Rise of New Millennium Collectivism, David Henderson 
 Capitalism, Morality and Markets, Brian Griffiths, Robert A. Sirico, Norman Barry & Frank Field Readings 54; 
 A Conversation with Harris and Seldon, Ralph Harris & Arthur Seldon Occasional Paper 116; 
 Malaria and the DDT Story, Richard Tren & Roger Bate Occasional Paper 117; 
 A Plea to Economists Who Favour Liberty: Assist the Everyman, Daniel B. Klein Occasional Paper 118; 
 Waging the War of Ideas, John Blundell Occasional Paper 119; 
 A Tribute to Peter Bauer, John Blundell et al. Occasional Paper 128; 
 Employment Tribunals Their Growth and the Case for Radical Reform, J. R. Shackleton Hobart Paper 145; 
 Fifty Economic Fallacies Exposed, Geoffrey E. Wood Occasional Paper 129; 
 A Market in Airport Slots, Keith Boyfield (editor), David Starkie, Tom Bass & Barry Humphreys Readings 56; 
 Money, Inflation and the Constitutional Position of the Central Bank, Milton Friedman & Charles A. E. Goodhart Readings 57; 
 Railway.com Parallels between the early British railways and the ICT revolution, Robert C. B. Miller Research Monograph 57; 
 The Regulation of Financial Markets, Edited by Philip Booth & David Currie Readings 58; 
 Bastiat’s The Law, Introduction by Norman Barry Occasional Paper 123; 
 A Globalist Manifesto for Public Policy, Charles Calomiris Occasional Paper 124; 
 Euthanasia for Death Duties Putting Inheritance Tax Out of Its Misery, Barry Bracewell-Milnes 
 Climate Alarmism Reconsidered, Robert L. Bradley jr (2003) 
 The Road to Economic Freedom', Philip Booth and John Meadowcroft, (2009) collection of IEA papers written by Nobel Laureates, foreword by Margaret Thatcher.

Notable people

Honorary Fellows

 Armen Alchian
 Samuel Brittan
 James M. Buchanan
 Ronald Coase
 Terence W. Hutchison
 David Laidler
 Alan T. Peacock
 Anna Schwartz
 Vernon L. Smith
 Gordon Tullock
 Alan Walters
 Basil Yamey

Personnel and Fellows
 the IEA had 19 employees and 11 trustees; six employees received total benefits of more than £60,000 per year, with maximum benefits of over £200,000.

 Mark Littlewood, Director General and Ralph Harris Fellow
 Philip Booth, Editorial and Programme Director
 John Blundell (died 2014), IEA Distinguished Senior Fellow
 Robert L. Bradley, IEA Energy and Climate Change Fellow
 Dennis O'Keeffe, IEA Education and Welfare Fellow
 Richard D. North, IEA Media Fellow
 Mark Pennington, IEA Political Economy Fellow
 Vladimir Krulj, IEA Economics Fellow
 Kristian Niemietz, IEA Political Economy Fellow

Directors-General
 Ralph Harris 1957–1988
 Graham Mather 1988–1993
 John Blundell 1993–2009
 Mark Littlewood 2009–

See also
 List of think tanks in the United Kingdom
 Economists for Free Trade

References

Further reading

External links
 Institute of Economic Affairs
 IEA Blog

Political and economic think tanks based in the United Kingdom
Economic research institutes
Non-profit organisations based in London
1955 establishments in the United Kingdom
Organisations based in the City of Westminster
Think-tanks established in 1955
Advocacy groups in the United Kingdom
Libertarian think tanks
Neoliberal organizations